The 14th arrondissement of Marseille is one of the 16 arrondissements of Marseille. It is governed locally together with the 13th arrondissement, with which it forms the 7th sector of Marseille.

Population

Education

The private Catholic school École Tour-Sainte is in the 14th arrondissement.

Demographics
Euronews claimed in August 2021 that the 14th arrondissement is "one of the city's most deprived".

References

External links
 Official website
 Dossier complet, INSEE

 
Arrondissements of Marseille